Rukn al-dīn Maḥmūd ibn Muḥammad al-Malāḥimī al-Khuwārazmī (died 19 October 1141) was a Khwārazmian Islamic theologian of the Muʿtazilī and Ḥanafī schools. He wrote six works known by title, but of these only one is completely preserved and two partially; the rest are lost.

Ibn al-Malāḥimī was born before 1090 in Khwārazm. He was probably active in Gurgānj, the capital of Khwārazm. In his time, Muʿtazila was popular among the Khwārazmian Ḥanafī, whereas it had been suppressed in most Muslim countries. He initially belonged to the Bahshamiyya branch of Muʿtazila, but adopted the theology of Abu ʾl-Ḥusayn al-Baṣrī after its introduction to Khwārazm. He helped turn the school of al-Baṣrī into a serious rival to the Bahshamiyya in Khwārazm. He taught theology to al-Zamakhsharī, who in turn instructed him in Qurʾanic exegesis.

Ibn al-Malāḥimī was a staunch opponent of metaphysics. He saw in the teachings of Ibn Sīnā a dilution of Islam's prophetic character. Christianity, in his view, was the paradigm of a religion of divine revelation and prophecy compromised by Greek philosophy. He wrote a compendium of the Muʿtazilī theology of al-Baṣrī, The Reliable Book on the Principles of Religion, but only the first section and part of another have been preserved. He wrote an abridged version of his compendium, The Excellent Book on the Principles of Religion, completed in December 1137. This work survives complete. In it he mentions two other works of his that are not known to have been preserved. Between 1137 and 1141, he completed a third book, The Gift to the Theologians Concerning the Refutation of the Philosophers, a comprehensive attack on Islamic philosophy, especially the teachings of Ibn Sīnā. Philosophy, he argues, will be used to justify false beliefs, as the Christians do with the Trinity and Incarnation.  This work once circulated as far afield as Yemen, but is now lost. His last work, The Abstract, is an abridged version of a work by al-Baṣrī on legal method completed by June 1140. It survives in a single incomplete manuscript.


Editions

Notes

References

Bibliography

11th-century births
1141 deaths
Mu'tazilites
12th-century Arabic writers
Hanafis